The 1996 African Futsal Championship took place in Cairo, Egypt from September 25 to September 30, 1996. The tournament served as a qualifying tournament for the 1996 FIFA Futsal World Cup in Spain.

Matches

Standings

Honors

External links 
Official Site
On RSSSF

1996 in Egyptian sport
September 1996 sports events in Africa
1996
1996
African Futsal Championship, 1996
Futsal
1990s in Cairo
Sports competitions in Cairo